Belgaumia is a genus of beetles in the family Buprestidae, containing the following species:

 Belgaumia capucinea (Kerremans, 1893)
 Belgaumia horni Thery, 1941
 Belgaumia sarrauti (Bourgoin, 1922)

References

Buprestidae genera